Anolis fitchi, Fitch's anole, is a species of lizard in the family Dactyloidae, named for American herpetologist Henry S. Fitch. The species is found in 
Colombia and Ecuador.

References

Anoles
Reptiles of Colombia
Reptiles of Ecuador
Reptiles described in 1984
Taxa named by Ernest Edward Williams
Taxa named by William Edward Duellman